Etica & Animali ("Ethics & Animals") was an academic journal of philosophy published quarterly from 1988 to 1998, covering animal ethics. It was established and edited by the Italian philosopher Paola Cavalieri.

History
Over its publication history, nine volumes were issued. These included the unpublished works of Peter Singer, Tom Regan, Edward Johnson, James Rachels, among others. The journal has been described as having been instrumental in introducing analytic philosophy to an Italian audience, as well as information about the animal liberation movement. It is also credited as internationally popularising the term "rights-holders" to describe animals. A special issue dedicated to the Great Ape Project, was published in 1996; Peter Singer served as special co-editor.

See also
Between the Species
Journal of Animal Ethics
Relations. Beyond Anthropocentrism

References

Animal ethics journals
English-language journals
Publications established in 1988
Publications disestablished in 1998
Quarterly journals